Revin is both a given name and a surname. Notable people with the name include:

Revin John, American radio personality
Sergei Revin (born 1966), Russian cosmonaut

See also
Devin (name)